The ruby tetra (Axelrodia riesei) is a species of freshwater fish in the family Characidae.
It is found in the Río Meta, Colombia, South America. In nature, it has a natural red colour, but this is somewhat lessened in captivity.

Named in honor of tropical-fish exporter William Riese, who collected the type specimen.

References

External links 
 Axelrodia riesei - Ruby tetra - FishBase
 Ruby Tetra Care Axelrodia riesei 

Characidae
Taxa named by Jacques Géry
Fish described in 1966